The Russian invasion and occupation of Ukraine that started in 2022 and the ongoing COVID-19 pandemic continued in the new year. In January, an Islamist suicide bomber killed 100 people in a mosque in Pakistan. In February, a series of powerful earthquakes killed at least 52,000 people in Turkey and Syria; this event was the fifth-deadliest earthquake of the 21st century.

Events

January 
 January 1 – Croatia adopts the euro and joins the Schengen Area, becoming the 20th member state of the Eurozone and the 27th member of the Schengen Area. This is the first enlargement of the Eurozone since Lithuania's entry in 2015, and the first enlargement of the Schengen Area since Liechtenstein's entry in 2011.
 January 3 – Starting from this date, many countries impose travel restrictions on travel from China due to the relaxation of the country's zero-COVID policy.
 January 5 – The funeral of Pope Benedict XVI is held at Saint Peter's Square within the Vatican City.
 January 8 
 COVID-19 pandemic: China reopens its borders to international visitors, marking the end of travel restrictions that began in March 2020.
 Supporters of former Brazilian president Jair Bolsonaro storm the Brazilian National Congress, the Supreme Federal Court and the Presidential Palace of Planalto.
 January 10–17 – A deadly cold snap in Afghanistan kills 166 people and nearly 80,000 livestock. 
 January 15 – Yeti Airlines Flight 691 crashes during final approach into Pokhara, killing all 72 people on board. 
 January 17 – Nguyễn Xuân Phúc resigns as President of Vietnam amid several recent scandals in the government.
 January 18 – 2023 Antiguan and Barbudan general election: Labour Party receives third victory in a row, winning 9/17 seats in the parliament.
 January 20 – The Parliament of Trinidad and Tobago elects former senate president, minister and lawyer Christine Kangaloo as president of the country in a 48–22 vote.
 January 25 – Chris Hipkins succeeds Jacinda Ardern as Prime Minister of New Zealand, six days after she announced her resignation.
 January 27 – Widespread unrest erupts in Israel following an Israeli military raid in Jenin which left nine Palestinians dead. Incendiary air balloons are launched into Israeli-populated areas following it. Israel responds with targeted airstrikes. Later the same day, seven Jewish civilians are murdered in a synagogue in Neve Yaakov in a terrorist attack.
 January 27–28 – The second round of the 2023 Czech presidential election is held, with Petr Pavel declared winner.
 January 30 – A Jamaat-ul-Ahrar suicide bombing inside a mosque in Peshawar, Khyber Pakhtunkhwa, Pakistan, kills 101 people and injures over 220 others.

February 
 February 2 – The European Central Bank and Bank of England each raise their interest rates by 0.5 percentage points to combat inflation, one day after the US Federal Reserve raises its federal funds rate by 0.25 percentage points. 
 February 3 – The US announces it is tracking alleged Chinese spy balloons over the Americas, with one drifting from Yukon to South Carolina before being shot down the next day, and a second hovering over Colombia and Brazil. This event is followed by subsequent detections and shootdowns of high-altitude objects elsewhere.
 February 5 – The 2023 Cypriot presidential election is held, with Nikos Christodoulides elected president.
 February 6 – 2023 Turkey–Syria earthquake: A 7.8 earthquake strikes Gaziantep Province in southeastern Turkey. A 7.5  aftershock occurs on the same day in nearby Kahramanmaraş Province. Widespread damage and at least 50,000 deaths are caused in Turkey and Syria, with more than 122,000 injured.
 February 13 – The 2023 Bangladeshi presidential election scheduled for 19 February is held, with Shahabuddin Chuppu of the Awami League, the only nominated candidate, elected unopposed.
 February 20 – A magnitude 6.4 earthquake strikes southern Turkey and is also felt in Syria, Lebanon and Egypt.
 February 21 – Vladimir Putin announces that Russia is suspending its participation in New START, a nuclear arms reduction treaty with the US.
 February 25 – 2023 Nigerian general election: Bola Tinubu is elected as Nigeria's president, defeating former vice president Atiku Abubakar and Peter Obi.
 February 27 – The United Kingdom and the European Union reach a new agreement surrounding modifications to the Northern Ireland Protocol.
 February 28 – A train crash in Thessaly, Greece, kills 57 people and injures dozens. The crash leads to nationwide protests and strikes against the condition of Greek railways and their mismanagement by the government.

March 
 March 2 – The National Assembly of Vietnam declares Võ Văn Thưởng as the country's new president after receiving 98.38% votes from the Vietnamese parliament.
 March 4 – UN member states agree on a legal framework for the High Seas Treaty, which aims to protect 30% of the world's oceans by 2030.
 March 5 – The 2023 Estonian parliamentary election is held, with two centre-right liberal parties gaining an absolute majority for the first time.
 March 10
2023 People's Republic of China presidential election: The National People's Congress unanimously re-elects Xi Jinping as the President of the People's Republic of China to an unprecedented third term.
 Iran and Saudi Arabia agree to resume diplomatic relations which were severed in 2016.
 Silicon Valley Bank, the 16th largest bank in the United States, fails, creating the largest bank failure since the 2008 financial crisis, affecting companies around the world.
 March 14 – A Russian Su-27 fighter jet intercepts and destroys an American MQ-9 Reaper drone causing it to crash into the Black Sea.
 March 17 – The International Criminal Court issues an arrest warrant for Russian president Vladimir Putin, the first against a permanent member of the United Nations Security Council.
 March 19 – Swiss investment bank UBS Group AG agreed to buy Credit Suisse for  3 billion in an all-stock deal brokered by the government of Switzerland and the Swiss Financial Market Supervisory Authority.

Predicted and scheduled events 

 April 2 – 2023 Finnish parliamentary election
 April 30 – 2023 Paraguayan general election
 May 6 – Coronation of Charles III and Camilla as King and Queen of the United Kingdom and the other Commonwealth realms in Westminster Abbey, London
 May 7 – 2023 Thai general election
 May 9 – May 13 – Eurovision Song Contest 2023 in Liverpool, England
 May 14 – 2023 Turkish general election
 June 25 – 2023 Guatemalan general election
 July 20 – August 20 – 2023 FIFA Women's World Cup in Australia and New Zealand
 July 23 – 2023 Cambodian general election
 September 8 – October 28 – 2023 Rugby World Cup in France
 October – November 26 – 2023 Cricket World Cup in India
 October 8 – 2023 Luxembourg general election
 October 14 – 2023 New Zealand general election
 October 22 – 2023 Argentine general election
 November 11 – 2023 Polish parliamentary election for the Parliament of Poland
 December 15 – 2023 Spanish general election for the Cortes Generales
 December 20 – 2023 Democratic Republic of the Congo general election

Date unknown
 Spring – 2023 Greek legislative election
 April – 2023 Andorran parliamentary election
 October – 2023 Pakistani general election
 2023 Libyan parliamentary elections
 2023 Zimbabwean general election
 India is projected to surpass China to become the world's most populous country.
 The European Spallation Source is expected to go into operation in Lund, Sweden.
 Türksat 6A, Turkey's first domestic and national satellite, is planned to be sent to space in cooperation with SpaceX.
 2023 Sudanese general election will occur as part of its transition to democracy, with a constitutional convention on the electoral system and form of government also scheduled.

Deaths

References